Shams ol Din (also Romanized as Shams ol Dīn; also known as Pīr Shams od Dīn) is a village in Teshkan Rural District, Chegeni District, Dowreh County, Lorestan Province, Iran. At the 2006 census, its population was 137, in 27 families.

References 

Towns and villages in Dowreh County